Francesco Cribario (died 1667) was a Roman Catholic prelate who served as Bishop of Nicotera (1658–1667).

Biography
On 6 May 1658, Francesco Cribario was appointed during the papacy of Pope Alexander VII as Bishop of Nicotera.
He served as Bishop of Nicotera until his death on 3 March 1667.

References 

17th-century Italian Roman Catholic bishops
Bishops appointed by Pope Alexander VII
1667 deaths